Guy Lacourt (7 August 1910 - 15 August 1984) was a French film director, assistant director and unit production manager.

Director 
1952 : Le Costaud des Batignolles 
1953 : My Brother from Senegal

Assistant director 
 1936 : Le Mot de Cambronne by Sacha Guitry
 1937 : The Pearls of the Crown, by Sacha Guitry
 1938 : Désiré by Sacha Guitry
 1961 : Le Triomphe de Michel Strogoff by Victor Tourjansky

Unit production manager 
From 1940 to 1972, he works as unit production manager for a dozen films.

External links 
 

French film directors
Mass media people from Lyon
1910 births
1984 deaths